The Samar hornbill (Penelopides samarensis) is a species of hornbill in the family Bucerotidae. It is found in forests on the islands of Samar, Calicoan, Leyte and Bohol in the east-central Philippines. As is the case with all Philippine tarictic hornbills, it has been considered a subspecies of P. panini. Alternatively, it is considered a subspecies of P. affinis.

References

 Kemp, A. C. (2001). Family Bucerotidae (Hornbills). pp. 436–523 in: del Hoyo, J., Elliott, A., & Sargatal, J. eds. (2001). Handbook of the Birds of the World. Vol. 6. Mousebirds to Hornbills. Lynx Edicions, Barcelona. 

Samar hornbill
Fauna of Samar
Fauna of Leyte
Fauna of Bohol
Samar hornbill
Samar hornbill
Taxonomy articles created by Polbot
Taxobox binomials not recognized by IUCN